Preiļi BJSS is a Latvian football club, playing in the second-highest division of Latvian football (1. līga). They are from Preiļi.

History
In 2008, Preiļi BJSS promoted from the 2. līga to the 1. līga. The team had a very successful season, winning almost all their games.

Their first season in the Latvian League one was largely unsuccessful. Preiļi had a few good games. The most surprising was the game against Latvian Cup winners FK Jelgava when the game ended 3–3. Preiļi ended the 2009 season just 2 points ahead of the relegation zone. The 2010 season in the 2.līga wasn't successful. The team had problems with their roster and Preiļi ended the season last, in 5th place.

Honours
 Latvijas 2.līga runners-up
 2008

League and Cup history
Preiļi

Players

First-team squad
As of 9 April, 2016.

External links
  Official website

Preiļi
Football clubs in Latvia